Thunder Lake can refer to:
 Thunder Lake (Alberta), a lake in Alberta, Canada
 Thunder Lake, Alberta, a hamlet in Alberta, Canada
 Thunder Lake Provincial Park in Alberta, Canada
 Thunder Lake (Minnesota), a lake in Cass County
 Thunder Lake Township, Cass County, Minnesota
 Thunder Lake (British Columbia), a lake in E. C. Manning Provincial Park.

See also
Thunder Bay (disambiguation)